The Lone Rider Ambushed is a 1941 American Western film directed by Sam Newfield and written by Oliver Drake. The film stars George Houston as the Lone Rider and Al St. John as his sidekick "Fuzzy" Jones, with Maxine Leslie, Frank Hagney, Jack Ingram and Hal Price. The film was released on August 29, 1941, by Producers Releasing Corporation.

This is the fifth movie in the "Lone Rider" series, which spans seventeen films—eleven starring George Houston, and a further six starring Robert Livingston. In this film, Houston plays a dual role as both the Lone Rider and the villain, Keno Harris.

Houston, once an opera singer, sang three songs in this film: "Without You Darling, Life Wouldn't Be the Same", "Ridin' Roamin' on the Prairie" and "If It Hadn't Been for You". The songs were written by Johnny Lange and Lew Porter.

This film was later released on DVD as Trapped in the Badlands.

Plot
Tom Cameron, the Lone Rider, pretends to be an outlaw named Keno—a task made easier due to the fact that Tom looks exactly like the outlaw. He pretends to be the outlaw in order to find Keno's accomplices, and recover a large sum of stolen money from Keno's last heist. Unfortunately for the Lone Rider, one of the outlaw's buddies, Blackie Dawson, begins to suspect Tom is not who he claims to be.

Cast          
George Houston as Tom Cameron, the Lone Rider / Keno Harris
Al St. John as Fuzzy Q. Jones
Maxine Leslie as Linda
Frank Hagney as Blackie Dawson
Jack Ingram as Charlie Davis
Hal Price as Sheriff
Ted Adams as Deputy Slim Pettit
George Chesebro as Pete
Ralph Peters as Bartender Gus
Charles King as Ranch Hand

See also
The "Lone Rider" films starring George Houston:
 The Lone Rider Rides On (1941)
 The Lone Rider Crosses the Rio (1941)
 The Lone Rider in Ghost Town (1941)
 The Lone Rider in Frontier Fury (1941)
 The Lone Rider Ambushed (1941)
 The Lone Rider Fights Back (1941)
 The Lone Rider and the Bandit (1942)
 The Lone Rider in Cheyenne (1942)
 The Lone Rider in Texas Justice (1942)
 Border Roundup (1942)
 Outlaws of Boulder Pass (1942)
starring Robert Livingston: 
 Overland Stagecoach (1942)
 Wild Horse Rustlers (1943)
 Death Rides the Plains (1943)
 Wolves of the Range (1943)
 Law of the Saddle (1943)
 Raiders of Red Gap (1943)

References

External links
 

1941 films
American Western (genre) films
1941 Western (genre) films
Producers Releasing Corporation films
Films directed by Sam Newfield
American black-and-white films
1940s English-language films
1940s American films